This is a list of libraries in Lebanon.

Libraries 

 Al Sa’eh Library
 Assabil Libraries
 Lebanese National Library
 Traveler's Library
 Baakleen National Library

See also 
 List of libraries by country

 
Lebanon
Libraries
Libraries